The Berkeley Tennis Club Challenge is a tournament for professional female tennis players played on outdoor hard courts. The event is classified as a $60,000 ITF Women's Circuit tournament and has been held in Berkeley, United States, since 2018.

Past finals

Singles

Doubles

External links 
 Official website
 ITF search

ITF Women's World Tennis Tour
Hard court tennis tournaments in the United States
Recurring sporting events established in 2018
Tennis in California